Adonis amurensis, commonly known as Amur adonis and pheasant's eye, is a perennial plant  with a golden yellow flower belonging to the Ranunculales order, and native to China (Heilongjiang, Jilin, Liaoning), Japan (Hokkaido), Korea, and Russian Far East (Primorye, Amur, Sakhalin). The Japanese name Fukujusō means fortune-longevity-plant.

References

amurensis
Flora of Japan
Flora of Amur Oblast
Plants described in 1861
Flora of Korea
Flora of Manchuria
Flora of Primorsky Krai
Flora of Khabarovsk Krai